El Palmar de Troya is a village in Andalusia, Spain. In 2018, it seceded from the municipality of Utrera and became the province of Seville's 106th municipality.

With a population of about 2,400, it is particularly known for the cathedral of the Palmarian Christian Church, a schismatic Catholic sect founded by Clemente Domínguez y Gómez, known as "Pope Gregory XVII" in the Palmarian Christian faith since August 6, 1978 as a result of alleged apparitions of the Virgin Mary (Our Lady of Palmar) and of Jesus Christ on the site from the 1960s. He was later claimed as true Pope of whole Catholic faith, instead of the accepted Cardinal Karol Józef Wojtyła, who took the name of John Paul II.

References

Municipalities of the Province of Seville
Visions of Jesus and Mary